antiX is a Linux distribution based on Debian Stable. 

It is comparatively lightweight and suitable for older computers, while also providing cutting edge kernel and applications, as well as updates and additions via the apt-get package system and Debian-compatible repositories. 

antiX specifically does not ship with or support the systemd init system. SysVinit is set as the default.

 Version 19 antiX offers sysVinit and runit as a choice for the init system.
 Starting with version 22 antiX is offered elogind-free for both 32-bit and 64-bit architecture.

Window managers
antiX comes with default SpaceFM Desktop Environment (DE) built on top of GTK library and IceWM as a Window Manager. antiX-full and antiX-base include these window managers:

 Lightweight: Rox-IceWM (default), IceWM and SpaceFM-IceWM. (Stacking WM)
 Minimalist: Rox-Fluxbox, Fluxbox and SpaceFM-Fluxbox. (Stacking WM)
 Very minimalist: Rox-JWM, JWM and SpaceFM-JWM. (Stacking WM)
Running the ROX or SpaceFM variants provides a drag-and-drop function and Conky system monitor support.

Versions
antiX is available for IA-32 (32-bit) and x86-64 (64-bit) architectures, and comes in four versions:
 Full, Includes X Windows, 4 windows managers, LibreOffice suite, and a 'Package Installer' which allows installation of a full range of applications (1.4 GB)
 Base, Includes X Windows, 4 windows managers, and a 'Package Installer' which allows the user to choose their own application suite (800 MB)
 Core, No X Windows, command-line installer without encryption, which enables the user to have total control over the install (440 MB)
 net, No X Windows, command-line installer without encryption, which enables the user to have total control with no desktop environment by default (180 MB)

These four AntiX versions were joined by MEPIS in 2014, developed in cooperation with the MEPIS Community to form MX Linux. MX Linux uses Xfce as the default desktop environment, is based directly on Debian Stable, is highly stable and gives solid performance from a medium-sized footprint. As of November 2016, MX Linux is now listed as a separate distro on DistroWatch.

Releases

antiX is a Linux distribution, originally based on MEPIS, which itself is based on the Debian stable distribution. It initially replaced the MEPIS KDE desktop environment with the Fluxbox and IceWM window managers, making it suitable for older, less powerful x86-based systems. Unlike Debian, antiX does not use systemd.
The releases of antiX are named after prominent left-wing figures, groups and revolutionaries.

See also

 MX Linux
 Category:Linux distributions without systemd
List of Linux distributions that run from RAM

 Lightweight Linux distribution

References

External links

 
 antiX on sourceforge
 antiX support group on facebook
 

Debian-based distributions
Linux distributions
Linux distributions without systemd
Operating system distributions bootable from read-only media